Huh Kyung-young (born July 13, 1947) is a South Korean politician, founder of the National Revolutionary Dividends Party (국가혁명배당금당, 國家革命配當金黨), cult leader, and singer.

Early life
On his official profile, Huh says he was born on January, 1st 1950 near Jungnanggyo, Seoul. His father, Huh Nam-Kwon, made his own fortunes, but was executed in 1950 for charges of being a Communist. He lost both of his parents at the age of four.

Political career
Huh has participated in the 1987 South Korean presidential election as a member of the New People's Party (Not to be confused with the New Democratic Party), and in the 1992 South Korean presidential elections as a presidential candidate for the Truth Peace Party., and in the 1997 South Korean presidential elections as a candidate for the self-made Republican Party, promising the revival of the Joseon dynasty and the merger of Gyeonggi province with Seoul.

After his run in the 2007 South Korean presidential election, Huh was banned from politics for 10 years for making false claims about election opponents, mainly Park Geun-hye, saying that he was conditionally engaged to the then-leader of the biggest conservative party and threatened to marry her after the results of the conservative party's primary. Other misinformation Huh spread during the campaign included claims that he attended George W. Bush's inauguration banquet on behalf of South Korea and he is an adopted son of late Samsung Group founder Lee Byung-chul.

Huh founded his own party, the National Revolutionary Dividends Party, in August 2019. He was a candidate for the 2022 South Korean presidential election, but lost far to People Power Party's presidential candidate Yoon Suk-yeol.

Public image
Huh is known for his antics and unrealistic campaign promises and is considered somewhat of a joke politician.
Huh has claimed that he possessed the ability to levitate, has an IQ of 430, and is capable of performing chukjibeop.

Discography
On August 15, 2009, the Liberation Day of Korea, he released his first digital single "Call Me", which borrows its hook from the Inspector Gadget theme song. In the song, Huh repeats the phrase "look into my eyes and you will be come healthier. Look into my eyes and you will be [more attractive]."

Bibliography
The hibiscus flower has not fallen (2000)

Religion related business activities
Huh has been known to give lectures in a complex called "sky palace" located in Yangju. Huh registered the complex as a religious organization, where many portraits of himself can be seen around the complex. The organization has been defined by the public as a cult, often supported by his previous fraud charges.

Electoral History

General elections

See also
1997 South Korean presidential election
2007 South Korean presidential election
2022 South Korean presidential election

Notes

References

External links
Official Website of the Democratic Republican Party (Korean)

1950 births
Living people
Democratic Republican Party (South Korea, 2008) politicians
South Korean presidential candidates, 2012
Gimhae Heo clan
Populism in South Korea